Runciman Rock is a rock marked by breakers, lying 0.1 nautical miles (0.2 km) east of Black Island at the southeast approach to Black Island Channel in the Argentine Islands. Charted in 1935 by the British Graham Land Expedition (BGLE) under Rymill, who named it for Philip Runciman, Chairman of the Board of Directors of Whites Southampton Yachtbuilding and Engineering Company Limited, where the ship Penola was refitted before sailing south in 1934.
 

Rock formations of the Wilhelm Archipelago